The Assassin of the Tsar is a 1991 Soviet drama film, starring Malcolm McDowell and Oleg Yankovsky. It was entered into the 1991 Cannes Film Festival.
There are two versions. One is filmed in English which later was dubbed over the Russian actors, and one in Russian. Malcolm McDowell pretended to speak Russian in the other version and was later dubbed.

Plot 
Timofyev (Malcolm McDowell) is a patient in an asylum who claims to be the man who killed Tsar Alexander II in 1881, and his grandson Tsar Nicholas II in 1918. Doctor Smirnov (Oleg Yankovsky) decides to apply a peculiar therapeutic method on him, but things go in an unexpected way.

A good portion of the film depicts the last days of the Russian Imperial Family in Yekaterinburg, largely narrated by Timofyev's voice-over from the perspective of Yakov Yurovsky, the chief guard and ultimately executioner of the family. In the scenes, Yurovsky is impersonated by Timofyev (McDowell) and Tsar Nicholas II by Dr. Smirnov (Yankovsky). Other members of the family function merely as background, with few or no lines.

Cast
 Oleg Yankovsky — Dr.Smirnov / Tsar Nicholas II
 Malcolm McDowell — Timofyev / Yakov Yurovsky
 Armen Dzhigarkhanyan — Alexander Yegorovich, Smirnov's superior
 Olga Antonova — Empress Alexandra
 Dariya Majorova — Olga Nikolaevna
 Evgeniya Kryukova — Tatiana Nikolaevna
 Alyona Teremizova — Maria Nikolaevna
 Olga Borisova — Anastasia Nikolaevna
 Aleksei Logunov — Alexei Nikolaevich
 Yury Belyayev — Alexander II of Russia
 Anastasiya Nemolyaeva — nurse
 Anzhelika Ptashuk — Marina, Smirnov's mate

See also 
 List of films about the Romanovs

References

External links
 
 Watch The Assassin of the Tsar online at official Mosfilm site (English-language version)

1991 films
Mosfilm films
1991 drama films
1990s Russian-language films
Films directed by Karen Shakhnazarov
Films set in psychiatric hospitals
Soviet multilingual films
British multilingual films
1991 multilingual films
Soviet drama films
Russian drama films
British drama films
1990s British films